Indian Pond was a settlement located northeast of Avondale, Newfoundland and Labrador. It had a population of 87 in 1956.

See also
 List of communities in Newfoundland and Labrador

Populated places in Newfoundland and Labrador